The Bob church (Romanian: Biserica Bob din Cluj) is the first Greek-Catholic church that was built in 1803 in the city of Cluj, Transylvania, at that time part of the Austrian Empire. The name of the church comes from the Romanian noble Ioan Bob, later bishop of the Romanian Greek-Catholic church, who paid for the construction of the church.

On 7 August 1864, Veronica Micle married here Ștefan Micle, the future Rector of the University of Iași.

References

Bibliography

Gallery

Churches in Cluj-Napoca
Greek-Catholic churches in Romania
Churches completed in 1803
Baroque church buildings in Romania
Historic monuments in Cluj County